Elmer Burton Wynne (January 20, 1901 – November 8, 1989) was an American football player and coach. He was a three-year lettermen at the University of Notre Dame from 1925 to 1927.  Wynne then played professionally in the National Football League (NFL), with the Chicago Bears in 1928 and the Dayton Triangles in 1929.  He was the head football coach at Colorado School of Mines form 1931 to 1932, compiling a record of 2–12–1.

Head coaching record

References

External links
 

1901 births
1989 deaths
American football fullbacks
Chicago Bears players
Colorado Mines Orediggers football coaches
Dayton Triangles players
Nebraska Cornhuskers football players
Notre Dame Fighting Irish football players
People from Norton, Kansas
People from Phillips County, Kansas
Coaches of American football from Kansas
Players of American football from Kansas